HNLMS K X was one of the three s of the Royal Netherlands Navy, built to serve as a patrol vessel in the Dutch colonies.

Ship history
The submarine was ordered from the Koninklijke Maatschappij de Schelde shipyard at Vlissingen on 27 June 1917, but not laid down until 1 November 1919, and finally launched on 2 May 1923. Commissioned on 24 September 1923, she sailed alone to the Dutch East Indies in late 1924.

World War II

After repairs at Surabaya K X returned to service on 8 December 1941 for local defense duties following the start of the war with Japan. On 25 December 1941 K X sailed to the Celebes Sea following the Japanese invasion of the Philippines.

On 8 January 1942 K X arrived at Tarakan in Borneo for repairs, just days before the Japanese invasion. K X slipped out of port on 10 January and after dark observed a large fleet of Japanese ships at anchor off the coast. While attempting to position herself for a torpedo attack the submarine was spotted by an enemy destroyer and was forced to submerge. Short on battery power and with faulty steering gear and only one diesel engine operating the submarine returned to Surabaya for repairs.

K X returned to duty on 24 February to patrol off Surabaya. During the Japanese invasion of Java she was damaged by depth charges and forced to return to port. On 2 March 1942 K X was scuttled at Surabaya to avoid being captured by the Japanese. K X was raised by the Japanese during the war and used as a floating oil hulk. Recovered by the Dutch after the war, she was scrapped at Surabaya in 1946.

References

External links
  
 

 

1923 ships
Ships built in Vlissingen
K VIII-class submarines
World War II submarines of the Netherlands
Maritime incidents in March 1942